Let's Go Crazy on LIVE is a 2019/2020 Taiwanese drama about an ordinary girl who is scouted by a CEO to become a famous influencer.

Synopsis
As an ordinary girl, working an ordinary job, at an ordinary convenience store, Lin An An (Chloe Xiang) had only one dream in life: to find a good, stable, government job so she could support her aging grandfather. With that single dream in mind, An An never even thought of becoming anything more than the ordinary girl she had always been. But all that changed the day You Yuan Le (Ben Wu) walked into her life.

The CEO of a highly successful internet platform company, Yuan Le always had an eye for talent. The day he met An An, he knew she had what it took to become an online sensation; though not everyone at work agreed with him. Making a bet with one of his company's top internet stars, Yuan Le guarantees An An he can turn her into an internet celebrity.

Wanting nothing to do with Yuan Le or his ridiculous bet, An An had every intention of turning him down, but something inside her just wouldn't let her say no. Agreeing to work with Yuan Le, An An takes her first step into the spotlight as she embraces this chance dream bigger dreams and stops hiding from the world.

Cast

Main Cast
Ben Wu as You Yuan Le 游元樂
Chloe Hsiang (項婕如) as Lin An An 林安安
Fan Rou (汎柔) as child Lin An An
Jolin Chien as Ren Hao 任豪
Belle Chuo (卓毓彤) as Ye Luo Sha 葉羅莎

Supporting Casts
Shiny Yao (姚亦晴) as Cindy
Li Xing Lu (李星鏴) as Zheng Mei Li 郝美麗
Lin Jing Lun (林敬倫) as Tank 坦克
Lin Jia Wei (林嘉威) as Princess Lia 莉亞公主
Kerr Hsu as Simon 賽門
Huang Yun Xin (黃云歆) as Marry 馬莉
Michael Chang (張豐豪) as Chen Jia Bao 陳家寶
Su Yan Ti (蘇妍緹) as Xiao Man 小蜜
Wu You Xi (鄔又曦) as Claire 克萊兒
Zhang Ruo Fan (張若凡) as herself

Cameos
Zhang Jia Yun (張嘉雲) as madam Jing Jing 晶晶夫人
Tang Chuan (唐川) as Lin Zhong Hua 林中華
Kai Di KID (愷弟KID) as host
Ma Guo Xian (馬國賢) as Peng Ci Wang
Marcus Chang as Roy

Soundtrack
Play Xia Mi Game (Play蝦米Game) by Glasses Men (眼鏡俠)
How Could I Forget about You (如何忘記你) by Zhang Ruo Fan (張若凡)
The Song for You (給妳的歌) by Zhang Ruo Fan (張若凡)
Attention (關注) by Glasses Men (眼鏡俠)
Be Brave, Remember (記得勇敢) by Ciwas Ma (馬曉安)
Do Not Look Back (不要回頭) by Ciwas Ma (馬曉安)
From Child to Adult (從小到大) by Don Gin Band (動靜樂團)
Still Love You by Marcus Chang

Broadcast

Ratings

References

External links
 
Official Website on SETTV 
 
 

2019 Taiwanese television series debuts
2020 Taiwanese television series endings
Taiwanese romance television series
Taiwanese drama television series
Taiwan Television original programming
Sanlih E-Television original programming